Prince George, Duke of Kent (George Edward Alexander Edmund; 20 December 1902 – 25 August 1942), was a member of the British royal family, the fourth son of King George V and Queen Mary. He was a younger brother of kings Edward VIII and George VI.

Prince George served in the Royal Navy in the 1920s and then briefly as a civil servant. He became Duke of Kent in 1934. In the late 1930s he served as an RAF officer, initially as a staff officer at RAF Training Command and then, from July 1941, as a staff officer in the Welfare Section of the RAF Inspector General's Staff. He was killed in a military air-crash on 25 August 1942.

Early life

Prince George was born on 20 December 1902 at York Cottage on the Sandringham Estate in Norfolk, England. His father was the Prince of Wales (later King George V), the only surviving son of King Edward VII and Queen Alexandra.

His mother was the Princess of Wales, later Queen Mary, the only daughter and eldest child of the Duke and Duchess of Teck. At the time of his birth, he was fifth in the line of succession to the throne, behind his father and three older brothers: Edward, Albert and Henry.

George was baptised in the Private Chapel at Windsor Castle on 26 January 1903 by Francis Paget, Bishop of Oxford. His godparents were King Edward VII (his paternal grandfather), Prince Valdemar of Denmark (his paternal granduncle, represented by Prince Carl of Denmark, his paternal uncle), Prince Louis of Battenberg (husband of his father's cousin), Queen Alexandra (his paternal grandmother), Empress Dowager Maria Feodorovna (his paternal grandaunt, represented by Princess Victoria of the United Kingdom, his paternal aunt), and Princess Christian of Schleswig-Holstein (his paternal grandaunt)

Education and career

Prince George received his early education from a tutor and then followed his elder brother, Prince Henry, to St Peter's Court, a preparatory school at Broadstairs, Kent. At the age of 13, like his brothers, the Prince of Wales, later King Edward VIII and Prince Albert, later King George VI, before him, he went to naval college, first at Osborne and later, at Dartmouth. He was promoted to sub-lieutenant on 15 February 1924, and was promoted to lieutenant on 15 February 1926. He served on the latter as a lieutenant on the admiral's staff before transferring in 1928 to HMS Durban on the America and West Indies Station, based at the Royal Naval Dockyard at Bermuda. His father had previously served at Bermuda on HMS Canada and HMS Thrush, as a watch-keeping lieutenant.

After leaving the navy, he briefly held posts at the Foreign Office and later the Home Office, becoming the first member of the royal family to work as a civil servant. He continued to receive promotions after leaving active service: to commander on 15 February 1934 and to captain on 1 January 1937.

From January to April 1931, Prince George and his elder brother the Prince of Wales travelled 18,000 miles on a tour of South America. Their outward voyage was on the ocean liner . In Buenos Aires they opened a British Empire Exhibition. They continued from Río de la Plata to Rio de Janeiro on the liner  and returned from Brazil to Europe on the liner , landing at Lisbon. The princes returned via Paris and an Imperial Airways flight from Paris–Le Bourget Airport that landed specially in Windsor Great Park.

On 23 June 1936, George was appointed a personal aide-de-camp to his eldest brother, the new king, Edward VIII. Following the abdication of Edward VIII, he was appointed a personal naval aide-de-camp to his elder brother, now George VI. On 12 March 1937, he was commissioned as a colonel in the British Army and in the equivalent rank of group captain in the Royal Air Force (RAF). He was also appointed as the Colonel-in-Chief of the Royal Fusiliers from the same date.

In October 1938 George was appointed Governor-General of Australia in succession to Lord Gowrie with effect from November 1939. On 11 September 1939 it was announced that, owing to the outbreak of the Second World War, the appointment was postponed.

On 8 June 1939, George was promoted to the ranks of rear admiral in the Royal Navy, major-general in the British Army and air vice-marshal in the Royal Air Force. At the start of the Second World War, George returned to active naval service with the rank of rear admiral, briefly serving in the Intelligence Division of the Admiralty.

He was patron of the Society for Nautical Research between 1926 and 1942.

Personal life

Marriage and children

On 12 October 1934, in anticipation of his forthcoming marriage to his second cousin, Princess Marina of Greece and Denmark, he was created Duke of Kent, Earl of St Andrews, and Baron Downpatrick. The couple married on 29 November 1934 at Westminster Abbey. The wedding was followed by a Greek ceremony in the private chapel at Buckingham Palace, which was converted into an Orthodox chapel for the ceremony. They had three children:
Prince Edward, Duke of Kent (9 October 1935). He married Katharine Worsley on 8 June 1961. They have three children.
Princess Alexandra, The Hon. Lady Ogilvy (25 December 1936). She married the Hon. Angus Ogilvy, son of David Ogilvy, 12th Earl of Airlie and Lady Alexandra Coke, on 24 April 1963. They had two children.
Prince Michael of Kent (4 July 1942). He married Baroness Marie Christine von Reibnitz on 30 June 1978. They have two children.

Relationships
There were rumours that he had affairs with musical star Jessie Matthews, writer Cecil Roberts, and Noël Coward, a relationship which Coward's long-term partner, Graham Payn, denied. While married, he had an affair with Margaret Whigham, later known as Margaret Campbell, Duchess of Argyll.

George was also rumoured to have been addicted to drugs, especially morphine and cocaine, an allegation which reputedly originated from his friendship with Kiki Preston (née Alice Gwynne, 1898–1946), whom he first met in the mid-1920s. Known as "the girl with the silver syringe" due to her addiction to heroin, Preston – a 
cousin of railroad heiress Gloria Vanderbilt – was married first to Horace R. B. Allen and then, in 1925, to banker Jerome Preston. She died after jumping out of a window of the Stanhope Hotel in New York City.

His other alleged sexual liaisons include a ménage à trois with Preston and José Uriburu, bisexual son of Argentinean ambassador to the UK José Uriburu Tezanos.

In addition to his legitimate children, he was said to have had a son by Kiki Preston. According to the memoirs of a friend, Loelia, Duchess of Westminster, Prince George's brother, the Duke of Windsor, believed that the son was Michael Temple Canfield (1926–1969), the adopted son of American publisher Cass Canfield – and the first husband of Lee Radziwill, sister of Jacqueline Kennedy Onassis.

RAF career

As a young man the Duke came to the opinion that the future lay in aviation. It became his passion, and in 1929, the Duke earned his pilot's licence. He was the first of the royal family to cross the Atlantic Ocean by air. Before his flying days, he entered the Royal Navy, and was trained in intelligence work while stationed at Rosyth.

In March 1937, he was granted a commission in the Royal Air Force as a group captain. He was also made the Honorary Air Commodore of No. 500 (County of Kent) Squadron Auxiliary Air Force in August 1938. He was promoted to air vice-marshal in June 1939, along with promotions to flag and general officer rank in the other two services.

In 1939 he returned to active service as a rear admiral in the Royal Navy, but in April 1940, transferred to the Royal Air Force. He temporarily relinquished his rank as an air officer to assume the post of staff officer at RAF Training Command in the rank of group captain, so that he would not be senior to more experienced officers. On 28 July 1941, he assumed the rank of air commodore in the Welfare Section of the RAF Inspector General's Staff. In this role, he went on official visits to RAF bases to help boost wartime morale.

Freemasonry
Prince George was initiated into freemasonry on 12 April 1928 in Navy Lodge No 2612.  He subsequently served as master of Navy Lodge in 1931, and was also a member of Prince of Wales's Lodge No 259, and Royal Alpha Lodge No 16, of which he served as master in 1940.  He was appointed senior grand warden of the United Grand Lodge of England in 1933, and served as provincial grand master of Wiltshire from 1934, until he was elected grand master of the United Grand Lodge of England in 1939; a position he held until his death in 1942.

Death

On 25 August 1942, George and 14 others took off in a RAF Short Sunderland flying boat W4026 from Invergordon, Ross and Cromarty, to fly to Iceland on non-operational duties. The aircraft crashed on Eagle's Rock, a hillside near Dunbeath, Caithness, Scotland. George and all but one of the those on board were killed. He was 39 years old.

Lynn Picknett and Clive Prince have written about the crash in their book Double Standards, which, however, has been criticised for its "implausible inaccuracy". 
They alleged that Kent had a briefcase full of 100 Swedish krona notes, worthless in Iceland, handcuffed to his wrist, leading to speculation the flight was a military mission to Sweden, the only place where Swedish notes were of value.

His death in RAF service marked the first time in more than 450 years that a member of the royal family died on active service. The prince's body was transferred initially to St George's Chapel, Windsor, and he was buried in the Royal Burial Ground, Frogmore, directly behind Queen Victorias mausoleum. His elder son, six-year-old Prince Edward, succeeded him as Duke of Kent. Princess Marina, his wife, had given birth to their third child, Prince Michael, only seven weeks before Prince George's death. His will was sealed in Llandudno in 1943. His estate was valued at £157,735 (or £5 million in 2022 when adjusted for inflation).

One RAF crew member survived the crash: Flight Sergeant Andrew Jack, the Sunderland's rear gunner. Flight Sergeant Jack's niece has claimed that Jack told his brother that the Duke had been at the controls of the plane; that Jack had dragged him from the pilot's seat after the crash; and that there was an additional person on board the plane whose identity has never been revealed.

In popular culture

The Duke's early life is dramatised in Stephen Poliakoff's television serial The Lost Prince (2003), a biography of the life of the Duke's younger brother John. In the film, the teenage Prince 'Georgie' is portrayed as sensitive, intelligent, artistic and almost uniquely sympathetic to his brother's plight. He is shown as detesting his time at the Royal Naval College and as having a difficult relationship with his austere father.

In May 2008, the BBC aired its Radio 4 comedy, Hut 33, Series 2, Episode 1, titled "The Royal Visit". The main guest character for this episode was Duke of Kent, played by Michael Fenton-Stevens. The show is set at Bletchley Park with a team of code breakers. The Duke has been chosen to make an impromptu visit, and the code breakers have been told to hide all evidence of their real work and invent a story. On no account should the Duke be told what really happens at Bletchley because he is a Nazi spy. He is also portrayed as promiscuous and bisexual, as he tries to gain sexual favours from one of the male staff, and one of the female characters recalls a previous liaison with the Duke.

Much of George's later life was outlined in the documentary film The Queen's Lost Uncle. He is a recurring character in the revival of Upstairs, Downstairs (2010/2012), played by Blake Ritson. He is portrayed as a caring brother, terrified of the mistakes that his family is making; later, he is portrayed as an appeaser of the German regime, but also as a supportive friend of Hallam Holland.

George and his eldest brother the Prince of Wales, later Edward VIII, are shown in Stephen Poliakoff's BBC television serial Dancing on the Edge (2013), in which they are portrayed as supporters of jazz and encouragers of Louis Lester's Jazz Band. A sexual attraction to Louis on George's part is also insinuated.

Honours and arms
 KG: Knight of the Order of the Garter, 20 December 1923 (formally invested in 1924)
 KT: Knight of the Order of the Thistle, 1935
 GCMG: Knight Grand Cross of the Order of St Michael and St George, 1934
 GCVO: Knight Grand Cross of the Royal Victorian Order, 1924
 Royal Victorian Chain, 1936
 ADC(P) Personal aide-de-camp to the King (appointed by Edward VIII), 23 June 1936
 Knight of the Order of the Elephant, 20 September 1922
 Knight Grand Cross with Collar of the Order of St. Olav, 20 December 1924
 Knight of the Order of the Seraphim, 1 October 1932
 Knight Grand Cross of the Chilean Order of Merit
 Knight Grand Cross of the Legion of Honour, March 1939

Appointments
 1932: Royal Bencher of the Honourable Society of Lincoln's Inn

Military
 Colonel-in-Chief, Queen's Own Royal West Kent Regiment (1935)
 Colonel-in-Chief, Royal Fusiliers (1937)
 Honorary Air Commodore, No. 500 (County of Kent) Squadron Auxiliary Air Force (1938)
 Colonel-in-Chief, Corps of New Zealand Engineers (1938)

Arms
Around the time of his elder brother Prince Henry's twenty-first birthday, Prince George was granted the use of the Royal Arms, differenced by a label argent of three points, each bearing an anchor azure.

Ancestry

References

Further reading
 (New edition in 1992 by Crécy Publishing, .)
 Millar, Peter. "The Other Prince". The Sunday Times (26 January 2003).
 Warwick, Christopher. George and Marina, Duke and Duchess of Kent. London: Weidenfeld and Nicolson, 1988. .

External links

Portraits of Prince George from the National Portrait Gallery
 

1902 births
1942 deaths
Aviators killed in aviation accidents or incidents in Scotland
Bailiffs Grand Cross of the Order of St John
British Army generals of World War II
British Empire in World War II
British people of German descent
British princes
Burials at the Royal Burial Ground, Frogmore
Children of George V
Civil servants in the Home Office
Civil servants in the Foreign Office
Dukes of Kent
Grand Croix of the Légion d'honneur
Grand Masters of the United Grand Lodge of England
Honorary air commodores
George, Duke of Kent
Knights Grand Cross of the Order of St Michael and St George
Knights Grand Cross of the Royal Victorian Order
Knights of the Garter
Knights of the Thistle
Lords High Commissioner to the General Assembly of the Church of Scotland
Members of the Privy Council of the United Kingdom
Peers created by George V
People educated at the Royal Naval College, Osborne
People educated at St Peter's Court
People from Sandringham, Norfolk
George, Duke of Kent
Royal Air Force air marshals
Royal Air Force personnel killed in World War II
Royal Navy admirals of World War II
Royal reburials
Sons of emperors
Sons of kings
Victims of aviation accidents or incidents in 1942